Lila Abu-Lughod (born 1952) is a Palestinian-American anthropologist. She is the Joseph L. Buttenweiser Professor of Social Science in the Department of Anthropology at Columbia University in New York City. She specializes in ethnographic research in the Arab world, and her seven books cover topics including sentiment and poetry, nationalism and media, gender politics and the politics of memory.

Early life and education
Abu-Lughod's father was the prominent Palestinian academic Ibrahim Abu-Lughod. Her mother, Janet L. Abu-Lughod, née Lippman, was a leading American urban sociologist. She graduated from Carleton College in 1974, and obtained her PhD from Harvard University in 1984.

Career 
Abu-Lughod's body of work is grounded in long-term ethnographic research in Egypt, and is especially concerned with the intersections of culture and power, as well as gender and women's rights in the Middle East.

Between the late 1970s and the mid-1980s, while she was still a graduate student, Abu-Lughod spent time living with the Bedouin Awlad 'Ali tribe in Egypt. She stayed with the head of the community, and lived in his household alongside his large family for a cumulative two years. Her first two books, Veiled Sentiments: Honor and Poetry in a Bedouin Society and Writing Women's Worlds, are based on this fieldwork. Both books draw on her experiences living with the Bedouin women and her research into their poetry and storytelling. She explores the way that ghinnawas, songs in a poetic form that she compares to haiku and the blues, express the cultural "patterning" of the society, especially with regard to the relations between women and men. Abu-Lughod has described a reading group that she attended while teaching at Williams College – its other members included Catharine A. MacKinnon, Adrienne Rich, and Wendy Brown – as a formative engagement with the field of women's studies and a major influence on these early books.

Abu-Lughod spent time as a scholar at the Institute for Advanced Study, with Judith Butler, Evelyn Fox Keller, and Donna Haraway. She also taught at New York University, where she worked on a project, funded by a Ford Foundation grant, intended to promote a more international focus in women's studies.

Her 2013 book, Do Muslim Women Need Saving? investigates the image of Muslim women in Western society. It is based on her 2002 article of the same name, published in American Anthropologist. The text examines post-9/11 discussions on the Middle East, Islam, women's rights, and media. Abu-Lughod gathers examples of the Western narrative of the "abused" Muslim women who need to be saved. Abu-Lughod further explains how the narrative of saving Muslim women has been used as a way to justify military interventions in Muslim countries. She deftly questions the motives of feminists who feel that Muslim women should be saved from the Taliban all the while injustices occur in their own countries. She argues that Muslim women, like women of other faiths and backgrounds, need to be viewed within their own historical, social, and ideological contexts. Abu-Lughod's article and subsequent book on the topic have been compared to Edward Said and Orientalism .

Abu-Lughod serves on the advisory boards of multiple academic journals, including Signs: Journal of Women in Culture and Society and Diaspora: A Journal of Transnational Studies.

Awards and honors 
In 2001, Abu-Lughod delivered the Lewis Henry Morgan Lecture at the University of Rochester, considered by many to be the most important annual lecture series in the field of anthropology. She was named a Carnegie Scholar in 2007 to research the topic: "Do Muslim Women Have Rights? The Ethics and Politics of Muslim Women's Rights in an International Field." She has held research fellowships from the National Endowment for the Humanities, the Guggenheim Foundation, Fulbright, and the Mellon Foundation, among others.

An article from Veiled Sentiments received the Stirling Award for Contributions to Psychological Anthropology. Writing Women's Worlds received the Victor Turner Award. Carleton College awarded her an honorary doctorate in 2006.

Significant publications

 Writing Women's Worlds: Bedouin Stories (University of California Press 1993) 
 Remaking Women: Feminism and Modernity in the Middle East (Editor) (Princeton University Press 1998) 
 Veiled Sentiments: Honor and Poetry in a Bedouin Society (University of California Press 2000) 
 Media Worlds: Anthropology on New Terrain (Editor) (University of California Press 2002) 
 Dramas of Nationhood: The Politics of Television in Egypt (University of Chicago Press 2004) 
 Local Contexts of Islamism in Popular Media (Amsterdam University Press 2007) 
 Nakba: Palestine, 1948, and the Claims of Memory with Ahmad H. Sa'di, (Columbia University Press 2007) 
 Do Muslim Women Need Saving? (Harvard University Press 2013)

Personal life 
Abu-Lughod is a supporter of the Boycott Divestment Sanctions movement. She is married to Timothy Mitchell.

See also 
Postcolonialism
Subaltern
Orientalism
Imagined geographies

Notes

Further reading
 An Interview with Abu-Lughod on women and Afghanistan
 Profile of Lila Abu-Lughod at the Institute for Middle East Understanding
 Columbia University Department of Anthropology Faculty
 Lila Abu Lughod: My Father's Return to Palestine Winter-Spring 2001, Issue 11-12 Jerusalem Quarterly (Accessed 17.06. 2012)
 Oral History interview with Lila Abu Lughod, 2015, IRWGS Oral History project, Columbia Center for Oral History Archives
 American Ethnologist interview with Lila Abu Lughod, 2016

External links 
 A Community of Secrets: The Separate World of Bedouin Women
 Bedouin Hasham in Lila Abu Lughod’s Book, Veiled Sentiments

Living people
American women anthropologists
American people of Palestinian descent
Carleton College alumni
Columbia University faculty
Harvard Graduate School of Arts and Sciences alumni
New York University faculty
American women writers
Princeton University faculty
Williams College faculty
1952 births
American women academics
American Islamic studies scholars
Women scholars of Islam
21st-century American women